Elizaveta (also Halshka, Gelzhbeta from Polish Halszka, Halżbieta) Vasilievna Gulevich, known as Galshka Gulevichevna (c. 1575 or 1577 - 1642, Lutsk, Volyn) was a representative of the ancient Ukrainian gentry family Gulevich, philanthropist, founder The Kiev Fraternal Epiphany Monastery and the Kiev Fraternal School, from which the Kiev-Mohyla Academy traces its history. She also bequeathed money to the Lutsk brotherhood. She cared about the development of spirituality and enlightenment. She is an Orthodox saint.

Biography

Before 1615 
She came from the influential gentry family Gulevich, known since the 15th century, whose representatives held various positions in Volhynia and other lands of the Commonwealth. This family reached high church positions and owned settlements. They probably origniated from Galicia.

The grandfather of Galshka Gulevichevna, Fyodor (Theodosius) Gulevich, was a Volhynian Orthodox Bishop of Lutsk and Ostroh, and had five sons. Galshka's father, Vasily Gulevich-Zateursky, was a Vladimir underage Volyn troop. From his three wives, except Galshka, he had sons Andrei, Mikhail, Vasily and Benedict, and daughters Maria and Anna. Galshka was probably born in his village of Zaturtsy in Volhynia in the 1570s.

In 1594 Galshka married Kryshtof Potey, son of Ipatiy Potey, a Zemstvo judge of Berestey (1580-1588) and a castellan (1588-1593), an Orthodox bishop of Vladimir and Beresteysky (since 1593), one of the main initiators of the Union of Brest, later a Uniate metropolitan Kiev and Galitsky. After the early death of her husband, Galshka Gulevichevna raised her daughter Ekaterina, in 1615 she gave her in marriage to and Orsha man named Nikolai Mlechka.

In 1601/1602 she married a second time to Stefan Lozka, Marshal of Mozyr. Galshka at that time was about 30 years old; Stefan was 60. The couple had a son, Mikhail, and lived in a family estate in Kyiv on Podil, not far from the city hall.

Donation 
At the end of the 16th and beginning of the 17th centuries, printing houses and schools appeared on Ukrainian lands. To support them, charities were launched, which it is believed Galshka joined.

On October 14, 1615, she compiled and signed a donation, which on October 15 was entered into the Kyiv city books. Thus, the donation entered into legal force. In the donation, she signed off her house with lands in Kyiv for the foundation of a new monastery, a hospital and a school for children of all classes. The donation noted:

I, Galshka Gulevichevna, the wife of his Grace Mr. Stefan Lozka, Marshal of Mozyr, with the consent of his Grace to all of the following, being healthy in body and mind, clearly voluntarily realize by this voluntary letter of mine that I, living constantly in the ancient holy Orthodox Church and reverently burning with zeal for her, out of love and friendliness for my brothers - the Russian people and for the salvation of her soul from ancient times I intended to do good to the Church of God <...> I give, I give and write to the faithful and pious Christians of the Russian people in the districts of Kiev, Volyn and Bratslavsky class of spiritual and secular: monks, priests and deacons of the monastic and lay ranks, illustrious princes, noble pans, gentry and any other rank and status to Russian people ...

As expected, the deed of gift indicated the boundaries of the donated estate, located not far from Kontraktova Square. In the deed of gift, Galshka stipulated the purpose of the deposit:

All this - for the Stavropegic monastery of living together according to the order of Basil the Great, also for the school for children, both gentry and bourgeois, and for any other way of charitable life that would <...> serve to educate and present the sciences of courteous children of the Christian people, and at the same time, to the inn of spiritual wanderers, so that the monastery, and the school, and the whole rank would be guided by the law of the Eastern Church of the Greek Rite.

Thanks to the donation of Galshka Gulevichevna, the initiators of the Kyiv Brotherhood received an estate with land in Lower Kyiv, to build a monastery and a school. The development of the monastery was carried out by the Caves monk, the founder of a number of monasteries in the Ukrainian lands, Isaiah Kopinsky, whose name is mentioned by Galshka in his donation. The school could have been housed in the house of Galshka Gulevichevna and Stefan Lozka, but the donation itself does not mention the building on the “yard with a parade ground”. By donating her estate, Galshka Gulevichevna made it possible to open the Kyiv fraternal school, which, after the reform of Petro Mohyla, had to play an important role in the history of Ukrainian education and culture.

Reverse of the anniversary coin "Galshka Gulevichevna" from the National Bank, 2015

The original of the donation document is unknown to historians, and copies of Galshchina's donation of the 17th century have not been found either. The oldest document is a handwritten copy from the copier of the Kiev-Bratsky Monastery of the second half of the 18th century, which is stored in the Central State Historical Archive. In 1774, Metropolitan Gabriel of Kiev handed it over to the Holy Synod along with copies of other documents kept at the Kiev-Mohyla Academy. From these copies, Metropolitan Eugene of Kiev compiled a collection that was kept until the beginning of the 20th century in the library of the Kyiv Theological Academy. The list from the donation was first published in 1846. Later, it was repeatedly reprinted and analyzed by historians (for example, in the works of Viktor Askochensky, Stepan Golubev, Nikolai Mukhin, Fyodor Titov.

Researcher Maxim Yaremenko noted that by the middle of the 18th century, the foundation of the academy was associated not with it, but with Metropolitan Petro Mohyla and Hetman Petro Sahaydachny. Galshka was first "remembered" in the mid-1760s, when professors of the academy faced a problem - the desire of the Cossack senior elite to radically reform the academy, turning it into a university. The Cossacks explained their interference in the affairs of an institution that was under ecclesiastical jurisdiction by the fact that it was founded by Sagaidachny. This forced the Mogilyans to resort to a deeper search for their roots, one of the results of which was the appearance in the history of the Kyiv Academy of the figure of Galshka, as the founder of the school. The history of the donation could help prove that the academy was not founded by the hetman, that its founders were not Cossacks, but a noble lady. Yaremenko also drew attention to the fact that there is no evidence, except for the assurance of the professors, that the original deed of gift appeared in some cases that required the involvement of documents from the academy and the Fraternal Monastery.

Return to Lutsk 
After the death of her second husband, in 1618, Galshka Gulevichevna became the guardian of her son. Mikhail became the owner of the parental Rozhev after 1628[12]. Leaving all the estates to her son, Galshka Gulevichivna returned to Lutsk, where she spent the last years of her life. Documents have been preserved about the legal and land affairs of Galshka, about estates, about the fact that son Michael converted to Catholicism. In Lutsk, Halshka Gulevichevna actively participated in the life of the Lutsk Exaltation of the Cross Brotherhood, and in 1641, shortly before her death, she made a will in which she bequeathed almost all her funds and those that she owed to the needs of the Lutsk fraternal monastery and its church.

Galshka Gulevichevna died in 1642. She was buried in the crypt of the Lutsk fraternal Holy Cross Church.

Galshka's house in Kyiv 
According to researcher Zoya Khizhnyak, the school financed by Galshka Gulevichevna could be located directly in the house that belonged to Galshka. Researchers Yuriy Lositsky and Larisa Tolochko localize Galshka Gulevichevna's "Kamyanitsa" on the site of the Annunciation Church and the kitchen of the Fraternal Monastery, which, with subsequent restructuring, have survived to this day, located on Podil on the territory of the National University "Kyiv-Mohyla Academy" at 2 Hryhoriy Skovoroda Street According to researchers, the house is a typical example of Ukrainian architecture of the 16th century - a house "in two halves". The building is brick, plastered, with a vaulted basement, rectangular in plan. However, the archaeological study of the "cook" did not reveal building materials older than the 16th-17th centuries; its foundation and walls were made of the same red brick.

Canonization 
On November 22, 2021, Galshka Gulevichevna was canonized as a saint, the Holy Synod of the Orthodox Church of Ukraine granted a blessing for the local veneration of Galshka in the dioceses on the territory of historical Volyn and in Kiev[27]. On February 3, 2022, the Orthodox Church of Ukraine made Galshka Gulevichevna canonized as Saint Righteous Elizabeth Gulevich. The day of celebration is set on September 18 (September 5, according to the old style) [28]. Member of the Synodal Commission for the canonization of saints, Archpriest Vitaly Klos, called Galshka an example of zeal for the confession of the Orthodox faith, the result of which is its patronage.

References 

Ukrainian saints
Ukrainian activists
Ukrainian philanthropists
1570s births

1642 deaths

Year of birth uncertain